Bajwa Kalan is a village in Shahkot in Jalandhar district of Punjab State, India.Kalan is Persian language word which means Big and Khurd is Persian word which means small when two villages have same name then it is distinguished with Kalan means Big and Khurd means Small used with Village Name.
The village is administrated by a sarpanch who is an elected representative of village as per Panchayati raj (India).

Baba Sukhchain Das 
There is a holy Gurdwara of Baba Sukhchain Das ji, who meditate there. Every year a big event of 3 to 4 days, locally called Mela, held in summers.

Transport 
Shahkot Malisian station is the nearest train station.

References 

Villages in Jalandhar district